Fiji competed at the 1972 Summer Olympics in Munich, West Germany. No medals were won by Fiji.

Athletics

Track & road events

References
Official Olympic Reports

Nations at the 1972 Summer Olympics
1972
Olympics